Tía Candela ("Aunt Candle") is a 1948 Mexican film. It stars Sara García.

External links
 

1948 films
1940s Spanish-language films
Mexican black-and-white films
Mexican comedy films
1948 comedy films
1940s Mexican films